Multiracial feminist theory is a feminist theory promoted by feminist women of color, including Black, Latina, Asian, Native American, and anti-racist white women. In 1996, Maxine Baca Zinn and Bonnie Thornton Dill wrote “Theorizing Difference from Multiracial Feminism”, a piece emphasizing intersectionality and the application of intersectional analysis in feminist discourse.  

Women of color, such as Audre Lorde and Bell Hooks, challenged the second-wave feminist movement for placing women's oppression at the root of sexism, without any regards to other forms of domination. Generally speaking, women of color acknowledge that race acts as a foundation power structure that heavily affects their lives. The activist work of WOC has been erased from the second wave movement. The term, "multiracial" was used to illustrate the importance of race interacting with other forms of oppression to understand gender relations. With a focus on race, multiracial feminism acknowledges, "the social construction of differently situated social groups and their varying degrees of advantages and power." The definition of multiracial feminism, as given by Becky Thompson, is stated as, "an attempt to go beyond a mere recognition of diversity and difference among women to examine structures of domination, specifically the importance of race in understanding the social construction of gender." The central point of this perspective is to focus in on the significance of race, institutionalized racism, and struggles against racial oppression to understand how various forms of domination influence women's experiences.

Overview 
Multiracial feminist theory influenced the recreation of Second Wave feminism. Second Wave feminism only focused on white middle-class women in the United States with a goal to be equal to (also white and middle-class) men, thereby, disregarding women from other economical, racial and ethnical backgrounds. Second wave feminism failed to address the overlap between racism and misogyny, as well as the issues that arise from it. There are multiple groups of feminist organizations that focus on their differing identities; for example, Hijas de Cuauhtémoc, which is a Chicana-based group. Another group, the Asian Sisters, focused on the drug abuse that was happening in Los Angeles around the 1970s.

History 
Having first gained momentum in the 1970s, multiracial feminism grew as a movement to challenge racist, classist, and sexist barriers; not as separate, singular matters but as interlocking identities that make up both privilege and oppression. Multiracial feminism is described as a “liberation movement spearheaded by women of color” and focused primarily on intersectional analysis and both an international and a multiracial approach to oppression.

Although not acknowledged by the second wave movement, women of color and white women took a stand to combat racism and colonialism. Black feminists believed that, "cross-racial struggle made clear the work that white women needed to do in order for cross-racial sisterhood to really be powerful." White women also recognized that sexism was not the root of women's oppression. They collaborated to put forth an anti-racist movement that incorporated inter-related forms of oppression.

Notable proponents 
 Maxine Baca Zinn, born in Santa Fe, New Mexico on June 11, 1942, Maxine Baca Zinn is a sociologist known as being one of the “foremothers of multiracial feminism.” Working alongside other feminist theorists like Bonnie Thornton Dill, Patricia Hill Collins, and Lynn Weber, Baca Zinn's hypotheses suggest a need for intersectional analysis regarding identities such as race and gender in contemporary feminism.
 Bonnie Thornton Dill is a dean of College of Arts and a professor at the University of Maryland. She has won numerous awards for mentoring, including the Jessie Bernard Award from the American Sociological Association.
 Becky Thompson is a human rights activist as well as an activist in feminism surrounding multiple issues or antiracism and gender and class issues. She has a PhD and has written around 100 or more articles.
 Patricia Hill Collins born in Philadelphia, Pennsylvania in 1948, she is greatly known for her article "Learning from the Outsider Within" which was published in 1986. She is a professor at the University of Maryland, she is working with students and graduate students in race studies as well as feminist studies.
Bell Hooks (September 25, 1952 – December 15, 2021) was an American author, professor, feminist, and social activist. The focus of hooks' writing was to explore the intersectionality of race, capitalism, gender, and what she described as their ability to produce and perpetuate systems of oppression and class domination. 
Audre Lorde (February 18, 1934 – November 17, 1992) was an American writer, feminist, womanist, librarian, and civil rights activist. She was a self-described "black, lesbian, mother, warrior, poet" who "dedicated both her life and her creative talent to confronting and addressing injustices of racism, sexism, classism, and homophobia."

Application 
A fundamental belief of multiracial feminist theory is the requirement of intersectionality to broaden contemporary feminist discourse. In spite of this, however, multiracial feminism struggles to gain momentum as an intersectional approach to combating oppression and is fairly new concept in the world of quantitative research. New though it may be, Catherine Harnois in her book, Feminist Measure in Survey Research, writes that multiracial feminism may be more beneficial to feminist discourse than once thought.

Family study, formation and power relations have been extensively examined using a multiracial feminist approach, the results of which reveal a hidden power dynamic between “advantaged families and disadvantaged families.” Advantaged families have been shown to rely upon the labor and disadvantage of poorer families, women, women of color, minorities and immigrants.

Women of color provide an "outsider within" perspective as they are active participants in domination while also continue to be oppressed by it. In understanding multiracial feminism, it is important to note how interlocking forms of oppression persist to marginalize groups of people. Although people continue to be oppressed, others are privileged at the sacrifice of those who don't obtain benefits of the system. Patricia Hill Collins defines the term, Matrix of Domination, to refer to how various forms of oppression work different depending on what social location one obtains. In reference to this term, people will have varying experiences with gender, class, race, and sexuality depending on what social position one has in relation to structural powers. In terms of interlocking oppressions, this results in different social groups experiencing varying subordination and privilege.

Activism 
Though women of color are rarely credited as being prevalent in the second wave feminist movement, it has become evident that multiracial feminism was very much present in the 1980s through the 1990s and even today.

In the 1970s, women of color worked alongside hegemonic, white feminist groups but found it to be mostly centered on the white, middle-class feminist issues of the time. With the help of white, anti-racist women, women of color gave rise to multiracial feminist theory and led to the development of organizations created by and for women of color.

Multiracial feminists of the 1980s challenged white feminism by speaking out of the individual experiences of women of color, immigrants, and “third-world women” who had been largely swept under the rug. This was mostly done through multiracial feminist writings which have been revealed to date as far back as the 1960s.

Online activism 

There has been a notable increase of multiracial feminists, journalists and bloggers using online media to write about and theorize on intersectionality and multiracial experience as it relates to class, gender and race cooperatively in contemporary society.

Journalist for msmagazine.com, Janell Hobson, wrote a critique of white feminist activism pointing out the fact that women of color are still being left out of the conversation in current feminist discourse. She claims that it is time feminists “reclaim solidarity” by recognizing race and gender as being intertwined, rather than separate matters to be deal with individually.

Similarly, Lara Witt who writes for rewirenewsgroup.com, calls upon both her privilege and oppression to understand her role as a multiracial feminist with the ability to speak out against racism towards Black, Hispanic, and Indian people.

Organizations 
In April 1996, there was a rally in Middletown, Connecticut led by a multiracial coalition. Taking place at Wesleyan University, the rally was organized in defense of journalist and author Mumia Abu-Jamal who had been placed on death row in Pennsylvania.

The Combahee River Collective was a black feminist group that started in 1974 and influenced multiracial feminism to be included in Second Wave feminism. They wrote A Black Feminist Statement to voice their politics and the changes they wanted.

Women of All Red Nations (WARN) is a feminist group created by Native American women that was formed in 1974 to fight the promotion of sterilization and the act of sterilization in Native communities.

In 1971, a group of Chicanas created one of the earliest feminist organizations of the Second Wave, due to sexual harassment within The Chicano Movement. They named this women's revolutionary group after a Mexican underground newspaper, Hijas de Cuauhtémoc. Later, some of the founders launched the first national Chicana studies journal, Encuentro Feminil.

Criticism 
Some criticisms have been raised challenging whether or not multiracial feminist theory can actually produce measurable results due to a lack of “existing survey tools” by which to quantify or examine those experiences.

See also 
 
 
 
Feminism and racism

References 

Feminist theory